The Book and Documentary Heritage Museum of Iran,  an artistic historical museum based on the display of paper works and is one of the sections of the National Library and Archives of Iran.
In this museum, a selection of valuable historical works including books and non-books materials, documents, manuscripts, calligraphic tableaux and painting, periodicals, rare and exquisite printed books and works related to some celebrities are exhibited.

History
Located on Haqqani Highway in Tehran, the museum was inaugurated in February 2016  
Earlier, the precious works of the National Library and Archives were exhibited independently in various halls. When Seyyed Reza Salehi Amiri was in charge of the library, a decision was made to change the use of one of the repositories to focus on the display of works and the official opening of a museum for the National Library and Archives of Iran. The purpose of its foundation was to promote the culture of society and spread of Iranian-Islamic culture.

Sections
Book and Documentary Heritage Museum of Iran includes two main sections:
 Exhibition Hall: In this hall, the works are exposed to the public in the form of seasonal and thematic exhibitions. The works of seasonal exhibitions are selected according to the richness of the organization's reservoirs and in proportion to a special historical occasion displayed periodically.
Assembly Hall: This hall is designed for holding cultural and artistic events, film screening, workshops, meetings and conferences.

Bust of Hakim Abul-qasem Ferdowsi Tusi

The  Book and Documentary Heritage Museum of the National Library and Archives of Iran holds a Bust of Abul-qasem Ferdowsi which was registered under number 1448 in Iran National Heritage List on February 25, 2020 by the Ministry of Cultural Heritage, Handicrafts and Tourism. This valuable piece of work was created in solar year 1313 (1934) by Abolhassan Sadighi and then installed in the foyer of the old and historic building of the National Library of Iran located on 30 Tir Street. But following the transfer of the National Library of Iran to a new building the bust is currently being held and is on display at the Book and Documentary Heritage Museum in the new address of the National Library. The dimension of this bust is 50 * 26 with a height of 70 cm and its main material is made of gypsum. At the bottom there is the master's signature and the manufacture date.

Memorial of Professors
In addition to works of art, this museum preserves and displays the relics of such masters as Mohammad Ali Jamalzadeh, Iraj Afshar, Mohaddes Armavi, Mahmoud Hesabi, Jalal Al-e-Ahmad and others. Among them, we can mention the relics and office of Puri Soltani, which was unveiled in this museum in November 2018 in honoring the efforts of this lady.

Nowruz Stamp
At the end of the solar year 1397 (2019), a mutual collaboration started between Book and Documentary Heritage Museum and the Museum of Posts and Communications. The result was the Design of Nowruz 2019 Stamp, using a drawing of one of the manuscripts of Hafez Shirazi Divan, dated 878 AH,and belonging to the National Library of Iran. This beautiful miniature which shows celebration of happiness and man’s love for Mother Nature specially in spring complies with this  beautiful sonnet by Hafiz: "Happy came the rose ; and more happy than that aught ...".
The stamp, dated March 13, 2019, in the number of seventy thousand rounds, is one of the most beautiful Iranian stamps published as the 55th stamp marking the global celebration of Nowruz.

Exhibitions
In this museum, a number of cultural events have taken place:
 Exhibition of Persian Manuscripts at the University of Bratislava, Slovakia
 Algerian Cultural Week 
 Exhibition on the History of One Hundred and Ten Years of the Persian Constitutional Revolution
 Ethnic and National Identity Exhibition
 Shahnama  Classic Work Exhibition in the Qajar Period
 Exhibition of the Documentary Heritage on Iranian National Cinema (in honor of Ezatollah Entezami)
 Exhibition on School Memoirs of the 1970s and 1980s 
 Exhibition of Top Works of Calligraphers from the Qajar Era
 Exhibition on the Caricature Works of Kambiz Derambakhsh
 Exhibition on the Local History of Isfahan with the introduction of the documentary heritage of Takht-e Foulad Cultural Complex
 Exhibition of “Dagger in the Back of History” on the occasion of anniversary of the death of Amir Kabir
 Exhibition on Gilded Works of Contemporary Artists
 Exhibition of 1979 Revolution marking stamps collection displayed on the occasion of the 40th anniversary of the victory of the Islamic Revolution, with cooperation of the Post Museum of Iran and revolutionary publications
 Exhibition of Allameh Helli’s Manuscripts
 Exhibition of Nowruz 1398 (2019) displaying 55 terms of New Year stamps and a number of exquisite historical travelogues
 Exhibition of “Hamedan the Inheritor of History marking documentary heritage of Hamedan Province
 Exhibition of Local History of Mazandaran Province
 Exhibition of Local History of Gilan Province entitled Gilan, the Bluish-Green Territory of Iran
 Calligraphy Exhibition of Azim Fallah students
 Exhibition of Local History of Yazd Province
 Exhibition of Italian Tourists Evening in Iran from the Bukhara Magazine's Evening Sessions in collaboration with “Bukhara Journal”
 Exhibition of Paintings Under Glass Curated by Mehrnoosh Besharat 
 Fars Province Local History Exhibition
 Exhibition of French Tourists Evening in Iran from the Bukhara Magazine's Evening Sessions in collaboration with “Bukhara Journal”
 Bright Night Exhibition on the birthday of the renowned Persian writer Jalal Al-e-Ahmad in collaboration with Bukhara Magazine
 Exhibition of Local History of Khorasan entitled "Khorasan, the Land of the Sun”
 Exhibition and Unveiling of Unseen Photographs from the Qajar Era being kept  in the National Archives of Iran in collaboration with the “House of Albums” of the Cultural and World Heritage Complex of Golestan Palace  on the occasion of the World Day for Audiovisual Heritage
 Women's Day Exhibition, about the historical marriage certificates of Qajar period celebrities

Oldest works in the museum

 Oldest Manuscript of the National Library and Archives of Iran: 
The oldest manuscript of the National Library and Archives of Iran is a collection of treatises dated 420 AH written in ancient manuscript on Baghdadi creamy paper. This work includes treatises such as: The Amazing Rulings and Judgments of Amir al-Moemenin, the first Shia Imam and Commander of the Faithful; Javidan Kherad (Book of Eternal Wisdom) by Abu Ali al-Muskawiyyah on Practical Wisdom and Advice; Al-Adab al-Saghir by Ibn al-Muqaffa on ethics; Kitman Al-Ser va Hefz Al-Lesan (Keep a secret and keep your mouth) by Abū ʿUthman ʿAmr ibn Baḥr al-Kinānī al-Baṣrī commonly known as al-Jāḥiẓ on ethics; and Zikr Al-Khalaefva Onwan Al-Maaref by Sahib ibn Abbad on the life story of the Prophet of Islam and the Rashedin Caliphs. 
What we know today from the history of this manuscript is based on the notes it contains: Abu al-Najib Abd al-Rahman ibn Muhammad ibn Abd al-Karim Karkhi has transcribed the manuscript in 528 AH with his handwriting appearing at the end. 
Then it was held by Allameh Amin for many years and Sheikh Agha Bozorg Tehrani had seen the work in Damascus at his place and mentioned it in the book Al-Dhari'a ila tasanif al-Shi'a.

 Oldest Document of the National Library and Archives of Iran:
The oldest historical document of the National Library and Archives of Iran is a decree of Sultan Abu Sa'id Bahadur Khan Ilkhani. The text of the document is written in the usual Taliq script used for the court documents of the Ilkhanid period and in the end a decree of Sultan Abu Saeed appears. This decree was issued in the Kouhak region of Fars in the first quarter of 726 AH. The names of the Emirs of Al-Tamgha, as well as the names of the person and the village belonging to him, have disappeared. But the information extracted from the context emphasize on a village in Fars being out of the government property of Injuids (The House of Inju) and its belonging to a person who is exempted from various taxes. This document has two red stamps, one black stamp on the front and six stamps on the back, which belonged to the bureaucrats. The text of the seals is written in Uyghur and Arabic scripts. The Arabic part of the seals mainly contains the main slogans of the Muslims.

Top historic and artistic works
Some exquisite works displayed in this museum are as follows:
 The Qur'an Manuscript in the handwriting of Zinal al-Abedin Qazvini dated 1219 AH (the period of Fath-Ali Shah Qajar) in Shiraz and all pages gilded and known as "the most exquisite Qur'an in the Islamic world"
 Amendment of the Constitution on the letterhead of the National Consultative Assembly dated 1325 AH with the signature  and autograph of Mohammad Ali Shah Qajar
 Manuscript of Complete Works of Saadi handwritten by Ali ibn Ahmad Shirazi dated 784 AH (registered in the UNESCO's Memory of the World Programme)
 Leaves from the Qur’an manuscript attributed to Baysunghur Mirza, the Timurid prince, dated AH 837 (1433/1434 CE)
 Qur’an manuscript in hand calligraphy by Mohammad Shafiq, (known as Mirza Kouchak; pen name, Vesāl Shirazi), dated AH 1259 (1843/1844 CE). Religious calligraphy work on Damascene paper with lacquered cover, in the style of the Vesāl family book tradition
 "Adviye Mofrade" Manuscript compiled by Abubakr Hamed ibn Samajun Andalusi dated 7th century AH
 "Sharh al-Isharatwa al-Tanbihat" Manuscript in Khajeh Nasir al-Din al-Tusi handwriting dated 672 AH
 the manuscript collection of various notes, in the handwriting of Mulla Sadra and Mirdamad dated 1050 AH
 Sahifa Sajjadieh Manuscript handwritten by Ahmad Nairizi dated 1121 AH
 The Muraqqa "Salavatieh" by Khajeh Nasir al-Din Tusi calligraphy handwriting by Mahmud ibn Muhammad Hassan on 1064 AH
 The book The Canon of Medicine (Al-Qanun fi al-Tib) by Ibn Sina, published in 1553 AD in Rome
 Golestan, Saadi's book in German, translated by Adam Olearius, published in 1654 AD
 Jihadiyah Treatise written by Mirza Issa Ghaem Magham Farahani published in 1233 AH as the first Movable type printing (lead printing) book in Persian supported by prince Abbas Mirza in Tabriz 
 "Vaqaye Etefaqiyeh Newspaper" with MirzaTaghikhan Amir Kabir as the license holder, started publication in lithography in 1267 AH
 "Shokoofeh Newspaper" managed by Maryam Amid Semnani; Director of "Mozayanieh School" in Tehran, as one of the leading and special newspapers for women, which was published from 1913 to 1919.

Gallery

Notes

References 

National Library of Iran
Museums in Tehran
Iranian books
National museums of Iran